This list of the Paleozoic life of Alabama contains the various prehistoric life-forms whose fossilized remains have been reported from within the US state of Alabama and are between 538.8 and 252.17 million years of age.

A

 †Acanthambonia
 †Acanthambonia miiiutissima
 †Acanthopecten
 †Acrocrinus
 †Adetognathus
 †Adetognathus unicornis
 †Agaeoleptoptera – type locality for genus
 †Agaeoleptoptera uniotempla – type locality for species
 †Agassizocrinus
 †Alaskadiscus
 †Alaskadiscus subacutus – or unidentified comparable form
  †Alethopteris
 †Alethopteris lonchitica
 †Alethopteris valida
 †Allegacrinus
 †Allocatillocrinus
 †Alloiopteris
 †Amphiscapha – tentative report
  †Amplexopora
 †Anisopleurella
 †Anisopleurella tricostellata
 †Anniedarwinia – type locality for genus
 †Anniedarwinia alabamensis – type locality for species
  †Annularia
 †Annularia radiata
 †Annularia sphenophylloides
 †Annuliconcha
 †Anoptambonites
 †Anoptambonites pulchra
 †Anthracospirifer
 †Anthracospirifer increbescens
 †Anthracospirifer leidyi
 †Aphelacrinus
 †Aphelaspis
 †Aphelaspis buttsi
 †Aphelecrinus
 †Arborichnus
 †Arborichnus repetita
 †Archimedes (bryozoan)Archimedes
 †Arenicolites
 †Arenicolites longistriatus – type locality for species
 †Armenocrinus
 †Artisia
 †Ascopora
 †Aspidagnostus
 †Aspidagnostus rugosus
 †Aspidiopsis
 †Astartella – tentative report
 †Asterophyllites
 †Asterophyllites charaeformis
 †Asterophyllites grandis
 †Asterophyllites longifolius
  †Atrypa
 †Atrypina
 †Attenosaurus – type locality for genus
 †Attenosaurus indistinctus – type locality for species
 †Attenosaurus subulensis – type locality for species
  †Aviculopecten

B

 †Bathytaptus – type locality for genus
 †Bathytaptus falcipennis – type locality for species
 †Batocrinus
 †Batostoma
 †Beecheria
 †Belemnospongia
 †Belemnospongia parmula – type locality for species
 †Bellimurina
 †Bellimurina sulcata
 †Bimuria
 †Bimuria buttsi – type locality for species
 †Bimuria siphonata
 †Bipedes – type locality for genus
 †Bipedes aspodon – type locality for species
 †Blountia
 †Blountia bristolensis
 †Borestus
 †Buttsoceras
 †Buttsoceras adamsi
 †Buttsoceras odenvillense
 †Buttsoceras vandiverense

C

  †Calamites
 †Calamites cisti
 †Calamites goepperti
 †Calamites suckowi
 †Calamites suckowii
 †Calamites undulatus
 †Calamostachys
 †Campbelloceras
 †Campbelloceras brevicameratum
 †Campteroneura – type locality for genus
 †Campteroneura reticulata – type locality for species
 †Camptocrinus
 †Camptocrinus columnals
 †Camptodiapha – type locality for genus
 †Camptodiapha atkinsoni – type locality for species
 †Caninia
 †Caninia flaccida
 †Carcharopsis
 †Carcharopsis wortheni
 †Cardiopteridiuim
 †Cardiopteridium
 †Carinamala
 †Carpolithes
 †Catoraphiceras
 †Catoraphiceras foersteri
 †Cavusgnathus
 †Cavusgnathus unicornis
  †Cedaria
 †Cedaria prolifica
 †Chirlotrypa
 †Christiania
 †Christiania subquadrata
 †Cincosaurus – type locality for genus
 †Cincosaurus cobbi – type locality for species
 †Cincosaurus fisheri – type locality for species
 †Cincosaurus jaggerensis – type locality for species
 †Cincosaurus jonesii – type locality for species
  †Cladodus – report made of unidentified related form or using admittedly obsolete nomenclature
 †Cladodus newmani
 †Clathrospira
 †Clathrospira euconica – type locality for species
 †Clathrospongia
 †Clathrospongia bangorensis
 †Cleiothyridina
 †Cloudia – type locality for genus
 †Cloudia buttsi – type locality for species
 †Cochlichnus
 †Coelconus
 †Coelocaulus
 †Coeloconus
 †Coelocrinus
 †Composita
 †Composita subquadrata
 †Conocardium
 †Conotreta
 †Conotreta apicalis
 †Conotreta concentrica
 †Conotreta multisinuata
 †Cordaicarpon
 †Cordaites
  †Cornulites
 †Crania
 †Craspedelia – type locality for genus
 †Craspedelia marginata – type locality for species
 †Crepipora
 †Cryphiocrinus
 †Ctenacanthus
 †Ctenacanthus elegans
 †Ctenerpeton
 †Ctenerpeton primum – type locality for species
 †Cyclomyonia
 †Cyclomyonia peculiaris
  †Cyclopteris
 †Cymbiocrinus
 †Cypricardella
 †Cyrtonotreta
 †Cyrtonotreta depressa – type locality for species
 †Cystodictya

D

 †Dalejina
 †Dasyporella
  †Decadocrinus
 †Deiracephalus
 †Deiracephalus unicornis
 †Derbyia
 †Diaphragmus
 †Dichocrinus
 †Dicoelosia
 †Dictyonites
 †Dictyonites perforata
 †Dictyospongia – tentative report
 †Dinotocrinus
 †Diorthelasma
 †Diorthelasma parviim
 †Diplichnites
 †Diplichnites gouldi
 †Diploblastus
 †Diplothmema
 †Diplotrypa
 †Discocystis
 †Dolorthoceras
 †Donalina – or unidentified comparable form
 †Dystactospongia

E

 †Echinochonus
 †Echinoconchus
 †Elasmothyris
 †Elasmothyris concimmla
 †Eliasopora
 †Elliptoglossa
 †Elliptoglossa ovalis
 †Endocycloceras
 †Endocycloceras perannulatum
 †Endothyra
 †Endothyra excellens
 †Eoconospira
 †Eoconulus
 †Eoconulus rectangulus
 †Eopteria
 †Eopteria conocardiformis – type locality for species
 †Eopteria richardsoni
 †Eostaffella
 †Eostaffella paraendothyroidea
 †Eotrochus
 †Ephippelasma
 †Ephippelasma minutum
 †Eremopteris
 †Eremopteris rhodea
 †Eremopteris rhodea type – informal
 †Eremopteris rhodeatype – or unidentified comparable form
 †Eremotoechia
 †Eremotoechia silicica
 †Eridopora
 †Euconospira
 †Eumetra
 †Eumetria
 †Eupachycrinus
 †Euphemites
 †Eurythmopteryx – type locality for genus
 †Eurythmopteryx antiqua – type locality for species
 †Eusphenopteris
 †Eusphenopteris lobata

F

 †Fenestella
 †Fistulipora
 †Foerstephyllum

G

 †Girtyella
 †Girvanella
 †Glossella
 †Glossella papulosa
 †Glyptagnostus
  †Glyptagnostus reticulatus
 †Glyptagnostus stolidotus
 †Glyptambonites
 †Glyptambonites glyptus
 †Glyptopora
 †Glyptorthis
 †Glyptorthis crispa – type locality for species
 †Glyptorthis glypta
 †Gnathodus
 †Gnathodus bilineatus

H

 †Haplistion
 †Haplistion armstrongi
 †Hedeina
 †Hederella
 †Hindeodus
 †Hindeodus minutus
 †Holcospermum
 †Hustedia
 †Hustedia miseri
 †Hydromeda – type locality for genus
 †Hydromeda fimbriata – type locality for species

I

 †Ianthinopsis
 †Inflatia
 †Innitagnostus
 †Innitagnostus inexpectans
 †Isophragma
 †Isorthis

K

 †Kingstonia
 †Kingstonia appalachia
  †Kouphichnium
 †Kullervo
 †Kullervo sulcata

L

 †Labechiella – tentative report
 †Leangella
  †Lepidodendron
 †Lepidodendron aculeatum
 †Lepidodendron obovatum
 †Lepidophloios
 †Lepidophloios laricinus
 †Lepidophylloides
 †Lepidophylloides intermedium
 †Lepidostrobophyllum
 †Lepidostrobophyllum majus – or unidentified comparable form
 †Lepidostrobus
 †Leptoptygma
 †Limnosaurus – type locality for genus
 †Limnosaurus alabamaensis – type locality for species
  †Lingulella
 †Lingulella alabamensis
 †Lingulella lirata
 †Lingulella pachyderma
 †Linocrinus
 †Lochriea
 †Lochriea commutata
 †Lophospira
 †Lyginopteris
 †Lyginopteris hoeninghausi
 †Lyginopteris hoeninghausii
 †Lyropora

M

 †Maclurites
 †Macrostachya
 †Matthewichnus
 †Matthewichnus caudifer
 †Meekopora
 †Meekospira
 †Meristina – tentative report
 †Metacamarella
 †Metacamarella pentagonum
 †Monogonoceras
 †Monogonoceras alabamense
 †Mourlonia
 †Myeloxylon

N

 †Nanopus
 †Nanopus reidiae – type locality for species
  †Naticopsis
 †Neilsonia
 †Neoarchaediscus
 †Neoarchaediscus parvus
 †Neuralethopteris
 †Neuralethopteris biformis
 †Neuralethopteris elrodi
 †Neuralethopteris pocahontas
 †Neuralethopteris schlehani
 †Neuralethopteris smithsii
 †Neuropteridium
 †Notalacerta
 †Notalacerta missouriensis
 †Nothorthis
 †Nothorthis tarda
 †Nothorthis transversa
  Nucula
 †Nuculopsis

O

 †Obolus
 †Oligotypus
 †Oligotypus tuscaloosae – type locality for species
 †Onychaster
 †Onychoceras
 †Onychoceras australe
 †Opisthotreta
 †Orbiculoidea
 †Orthonychia
 †Orthotetes
 †Ovatia

P

 †Pachyglossella – type locality for genus
 †Pachyglossella dorsiconvexa – type locality for species
 †Pachyglossella pachydermata
 †Pachystylostroma
 †Paladin
 †Palaeophycus
 †Paleostachya
 †Paleozygopleura
 †Palmatopteris
 †Palmatopteris furcata
 †Paraconularia
 †Parastrophina
 †Parastrophina bilobata
 †Patellilabia
 †Paterula
 †Paterula perjecta
 †Paurorthis
 †Paurorthis fasciculata
  †Pecopteris
 †Pecopteris arborescens
 †Penneritopora
 †Penniretopora
  †Pentremites
 †Pentremites laminatus
 †Pentremites tulipaformis
 †Perimecocoelia
 †Perimecocoelia semicostata
  †Petalodus – tentative report
 †Phacelocrinus
 †Phanocrinus
 †Pharciphyzelus – type locality for genus
 †Pharciphyzelus lacefieldi – type locality for species
 †Phestia
 †Phosphanulus
 †Phragmodictya
 †Phragmodictya rugosa – type locality for species
 †Phragmorthis
 †Phragmorthis biittsi
 †Pileospongia – type locality for genus
 †Pileospongia lopados – type locality for species
 †Pinnularia
   †Platyceras
  †Platycrinites
 †Platyzona
 †Pojetaconcha
 †Pojetaconcha alabamensis – type locality for species
 †Polypora
 †Prismapora
 †Prismopora
 †Prismpora
 †Proagnostus
 †Protocycloceras
 †Protocycloceras odenvillense
 †Protoniella
 †Protovirgularia
 †Psammodus
 †Pseudagnostus
 †Pseudagnostus contracta
 †Pseudomonotis
 †Pterocrinus
 †Pterotocrinus
 †Ptychoglyptus
 †Ptychoglyptus virginiensis
 †Ptychopleurella
 †Ptylopora
 †Punctospirifer

Q

 †Quadropedia – type locality for genus
 †Quadropedia prima – type locality for species
 †Quasiarcgaediscus
 †Quasiarcgaediscus clausiluminus – or unidentified comparable form

R

 †Rachis
 †Ramulocrinus
 †Raphistoma
 †Raphistoma pelhamensis – type locality for species
 †Reticularia (protist)
 †Reticulariina
 †Reticycloceras
 †Rhabdomeson
 †Rhabomeson
 †Rhipidomella
 †Rhombopora
 †Rhopocrinus
 †Rhynchospirina – tentative report
 †Rhysotreta
 †Rhysotreta corrugata

S

 †Saivodus – report made of unidentified related form or using admittedly obsolete nomenclature
 †Saivodus striatus
 †Scaphelasma
 †Scaphelasma septatum
 †Scheillwinella
 †Schellwienella
 †Schizambon
 †Schizodus
 †Schizopea – type locality for genus
 †Schizopea washburnei – type locality for species
 †Schizotreta
 †Schizotreta corrugata
 †Schizotreta subconica
 †Schizotreta willardi
 †Selenichnites
 †Septimyalina
 †Septopora
  †Sigillaria
 †Sigillaria elegans
 †Sigillaria ichthyolepis
 †Sigillaria scutella
 †Sigillaria scutellata
 †Sivorthis
 †Sivorthis tenuicostatus
 †Skenidioides
 †Skenidioides convexus
  †Solenopora
 †Spenopteris
 †Spenopteris pseudocristata
 †Sphaeriella – type locality for genus
 †Sphaeriella radiata – type locality for species
  †Sphenophyllum
 †Sphenophyllum cuneifolium
 †Sphenophyllum emarginatum
  †Sphenopteris
 †Sphenopteris brongniarti
 †Sphenopteris elegans
 †Sphenopteris herbacea
 †Sphenopteris pottsvillea
 †Sphenopteris pseudocristata
 †Sphenopteris schatzlarensis
 †Spinilingula
 †Spinilingula intralamellata
 Spirorbis
 †Spondylotreta
 †Spondylotreta concentrica
 †Stegocoelia
 †Straparollus
 †Streblochondria
 †Streblotrypa
 †Strophostylus
 †Syringodendron

T

 †Tabuliopora
 †Tabulipora
 †Talasotreta
 †Talasotreta gigantea
 †Taphrorthis
 †Taphrorthis peculiaris
 †Teiichispira
 †Teiichispira odenvillensis
 †Tetranota
 †Tetranota obsoleta – or unidentified comparable form
 †Thamniscus
 †Thamnodictya – tentative report
 †Thamnodictya radiata
 †Thanmiscus
 †Titanambonites
 †Titanambonites amplus
 †Torynelasma
 †Torynelasma minor
 †Torynelasma torynijeriim
 †Torynifer
 †Trematis
 †Trematis elliptopora
 †Trematis spinosa
   †Treptichnus
 †Treptichnus apsorum – type locality for species
 †Trigonocarpus
 †Trigonocarpus ampulliforme
 †Triplesia
 †Triplesia carinata
 †Trisaurus – type locality for genus
 †Trisaurus lachrymus – type locality for species
 †Tropidothyris
 †Tropidothyris pentagona

U

 †Ulodendron
 †Ulodendron majus
 †Undichna
 †Undiferina
 †Undiferina rugosa

V

 †Vermiporella

W

 †Westonia
 †Westonia superba
 †Wewokella
 †Wewokella costata
 †Whittleseya
 †Whittleseya elegans

X

 †Xenambonites – type locality for genus
 †Xenambonites undosus – type locality for species

Z

 †Zaphrentoides
 †Zygospira – tentative report
 †Zygospira matutina – type locality for species

References
 

Paleozoic
Life
Alabama